Kuusiku may refer to several places in Estonia:

Kuusiku, small borough in Rapla Parish, Rapla County
Kuusiku, Hiiu County, village in Emmaste Parish, Hiiu County
Kuusiku, Kihelkonna Parish, village in Kihelkonna Parish, Saare County
Kuusiku, Pihtla Parish, village in Pihtla Parish, Saare County
Kuusiku, Tartu County, village in Vara Parish, Tartu County

See also
Kuusik